José A. Quiñonez is an American financial-services innovator and winner of the MacArthur Fellows Program. He founded the San Francisco-based nonprofit Mission Asset Fund in 2007 in order to legitimize informal peer-to-peer lending networks in order to help marginalized groups build credit and serves as its CEO.

Education
In 1994, he received a B.A. from the University of California, Davis and an M.P.A. in 1998 from Princeton University.

References

MacArthur Fellows
Living people
Year of birth missing (living people)
American company founders
American chief executives of financial services companies
University of California, Davis alumni
Princeton School of Public and International Affairs alumni